North Irving Transit Center is a bus-only station located along Northwest Highway (Spur 348) in Irving, Texas (USA). It is joined with the Las Colinas Urban Center and Irving Convention Center Stations as the DART  light rail line opened on July 30, 2012. Upon the opening of said light rail system, North Irving Transit Center was closed off and all routes are modified/diverted to Las Colinas Urban Center and University of Dallas Stations. However, it reopened on December 3, 2012.

Throughout the Transit Center's dormancy, its parking lot remained available for customers taking the Orange Line light rail service from Irving Convention Center Station. Access to the station platform is available via a walkway and pedestrian crossing under Northwest Highway.

There had been talks of reopening North Irving Transit Center as a Bus Plaza connecting Irving Convention Center Station sometime in December 2012. This was reached as a goal to improve transfer opportunities between Irving/Las Colinas buses as well as bus/rail connections. With that said, a number of routes were relocated from Las Colinas Urban Center Station to the Irving Convention Center Station and/or the North Irving Transit Center. Some of these routes will connect Irving Convention Center Station and the North Irving Transit Center directly, and customers will have an option to either walk or take a bus for this connection.

After the DART bus network redesign effective January 24, 2022, the transit center no longer has any bus service.

References

External links 
Dallas Area Rapid Transit - North Irving Transit Center

Dallas Area Rapid Transit
Bus stations in Texas